Charles F. Berman Field is a multi-use stadium in Ithaca, New York on the campus of Cornell University. It is used for soccer and track and field competitions.  It is located on a portion of the upper alumni fields.

Constructed in 2000, the 1,000 seat stadium is named in honor of former Cornell soccer player Charles F. Berman who was captain of the 1948 Cornell soccer team and a member of the Quill and Dagger society. Berman perished in an airplane crash in Jamaica en route to Colombia on January 21, 1960.

External links
 Information at Cornell athletics

Soccer venues in New York (state)
Cornell Big Red
Cornell Big Red sports venues
2000 establishments in New York (state)
Sports venues completed in 2000
College track and field venues in the United States
Athletics (track and field) venues in New York (state)
College soccer venues in the United States